This list of reptiles of California includes the snakes, turtles and lizards found in the US state of California.

 Endemic species.
 Introduced species.

Lizards

Family Anguidae

Family Anniellidae

Family Crotaphytidae

Family Gekkonidae

Family Helodermatidae

Family Iguanidae

Family Phrynosomatidae

Family Scincidae

Family Teiidae

Family Xantusiidae

Family Lacertidae

Snakes

Family Boidae

Family Colubridae

Family Leptotyphlopidae

Family Typhlopidae

Family Viperidae

Turtles

Family Cheloniidae

Family Chelydridae

Family Dermochelyidae

Family Emydidae

Family Kinosternidae

Family Testudinidae

Family Trionychidae

References

External links

Reptiles
California